Andrew Maitland Moravcsik (born 1957) is professor of politics and international affairs, director of the Liechtenstein Institute on Self-Determination, and founding director of both the European Union Program and the International Relations Faculty Colloquium at Princeton University. He holds a lifetime appointment as distinguished affiliated professor at the Technische Universität München, in Munich, Germany, where he is affiliated with its Hochschule für Politik.

Moravcsik is known for his academic research and policy writing on European integration, international organizations, human rights, qualitative/historical methods, and American and European foreign policy, for developing the theory of liberal intergovernmentalism to explain European Union (EU) politics, and for his work on liberal theories of international relations. He is also active in teaching and developing qualitative methods, including the development of "active citation": a standard designed to render qualitative social science research transparent. 

Moravcsik is also a former policy-maker who currently serves as book review editor (Europe) of Foreign Affairs magazine. He was previously nonresident senior fellow of The Brookings Institution, contributing editor of Newsweek magazine and held other journalistic positions.

Academic career

Academic positions
In 1992 Moravcsik began teaching at Harvard University's Department of Government. During his 12-year tenure in the department, Moravcsik became a full professor and founded Harvard's European Union program. He left the school in 2004 to assume a post at Princeton University, where he again founded an EU program. As of 2019, he directs the Liechtenstein Institute on Self-Determination at Princeton University, a research institute that focuses on questions of globalization, sovereignty and self-determination, with special attention to Europe, the European Union, and Eurasia. He has also been affiliated with the University of Chicago, Columbia University, New York University, and the University of Pennsylvania, as well as various French, British, German, Italian and Chinese research institutes.

During the academic year 2007–2008 he was affiliated with the Shanghai Institute for International Studies. During the academic year 2011–2012, he was visiting fellow at the Institute for Advanced Study, Princeton, New Jersey. In the 2015-2016 year, he was senior fellow at the German Marshall Fund in Washington, DC. Also, during the 2019-2020 year, he was distinguished fellow at Perry World House, University of Pennsylvania.

Academic publications
With nearly 40,000 academic citations, Moravcsik is the most cited US-based political scientist of his cohort. These writings include one book, titled The Choice for Europe: Social Purpose and State Power from Messina to Maastricht, three edited volumes, and over 150 academic book chapters, journal articles, and reviews. The book, which the American Historical Review called "the most important work in the field" of modern European studies, attempts to explain why the member states of the European Union agreed to cede sovereignty to a supranational entity. 

Moravcsik's "liberal intergovernmentalist" theory of European integration is widely regarded as a plausible account of the emergence and evolution of the European Union. It stresses the issue-specific functional national interests of member states and goes on to analyze the interstate bargains they strike among themselves and the rational incentive to construct institutions to render enforcement and elaboration of those bargains credible. Quantitative studies of research citations in EU studies conclude that liberal intergovernmentalism currently serves as the "baseline" academic theory of European integration, that is, it is the theory that most often confirmed and taken as a baseline for further extensions or for identification of anomalies.  A recent restatement of liberal intergovernmentalism, published in 2018, elaborates a future research agenda.

Regarding international relations theory more generally, Moravcsik adheres to "liberal" theory in the sense that he seeks to explain state behavior with reference to variation in the underlying social purposes (substantive "preferences" or "fundamental national interests," material or ideational) that states derive from their embeddedness in an interdependent domestic and transnational civil society. In contrast to realist, institutionalist, and various types of "constructivist" or "non-rational" theory, liberal theory privileges and directly theorizes social interdependence and globalization as the dominant force in world politics, past and present. Liberal theory, Moravcsik maintains, is not empirically sufficient to explain all of international relations, but it is analytically more fundamental than other types of international relations theory. 

Moravcsik advocates greater transparency and replicability of textual, qualitative and historical research in international relations, political science, and the social sciences more generally. To this end, he has proposed the use of "active citation" the use of precise footnotes hyperlinked to source material contained in an appendix or on a permanent qualitative data repository. He has worked with other scholars to extend this approach through the "Annotation for Transparent Inquiry" (ATI) initiative. Moravcsik's book The Choice for Europe was criticized for imprecise and misleading use of historical sources.

Policy career

Policy positions
Prior to the start of his academic career, Moravcsik served in policy positions for governments on three continents. He was international trade negotiator at the US Department of Commerce, special assistant to South Korean Deputy Prime Minister Lee Hahn-Been, and press assistant at the Commission of the European Communities, as well as an editor of a Washington-based foreign policy journal. He has subsequently served as a member and in leadership positions on policy commissions organized by the Council on Foreign Relations, the Brookings Institution, the Carnegie Endowment, the Commission of the European Communities, Princeton University and other organizations.

Public commentary
Since 2002, he has written over 150 pieces of public commentary. These include dozens of articles and commentaries, including cover stories in Newsweek, Foreign Affairs and Prospect. He has also written for the Financial Times, New York Times, and many other publications. He has lectured about the European Union at The Pentagon, was a guest on NPR's Talk of the Nation, and has been quoted in multiple news sources, including
Deutsche Welle,
International Herald Tribune,
and USA Today. Since 2009, he has served as book review editor (Europe) for Foreign Affairs magazine. He continues to engage in regular policy analysis and advising, currently focusing on EU–US burden-sharing, the democratic deficit in Europe, transatlantic relations, the future of the European Union, and Asian regionalism. He is known for his argument that Europe is the world's "second superpower" and for a soberly optimistic assessments of the European Union. He has also written and spoken for The Atlantic and other media outlets on the desirability of men serving as the "lead parent" for children and playing an equal or more active role in caring work.

Education
Moravcsik received a BA in history from Stanford University in 1980 and, after a period working in the US and Asia, spent the next year and a half as a Fulbright fellow at the universities of Bielefeld, Hamburg, and Marburg in West Germany. In 1982 he enrolled at the Johns Hopkins University's School of Advanced International Studies (SAIS) in Washington, DC, from which he received a Master of Arts degree in international relations in 1984. In 1992 he obtained an MA and PhD in political science from Harvard University.

Personal life
Moravcsik is married to the political scientist and think-tank director Anne-Marie Slaughter, with whom he has two sons. 

His father, Michael Moravcsik (1928–1989), was a Hungarian immigrant to the United States active as a professor of theoretical particle physics, an expert on science development, and a pioneer in the field of citation studies. Andrew Moravcsik's mother, Francesca de Gogorza, comes from a New England family of Basque, Hispanic, Dutch, German, Scottish, English and Native American ancestry. She worked for decades as a landscape architect and urban planner, and now lives in South Burlington, Vermont. Francesca is the daughter of Ernesto Maitland de Gogorza (1896–1941), a graphic artist and painter who taught art at Smith College, and a descendant of the British-Quebecois-American painter Henry Daniel Thielcke.

Publications with over 500 citations
  (cited 7647 times)
  (cited 4366 times) [Named one of the "5 best articles of the decade" by JCMS]
  (cited 3919 times)
  (cited 2157 times)
  (cited 2156 times)
 Kenneth Abbott, Robert Keohane, Andrew Moravcsik and Anne-Marie Slaughter, "The Concept of Legalization," International Organization, Volume 54, Issue 3 (Summer 2000), pp. 401–419. (cited 1914 times)
  (cited 1395 times)
 Moravcsik, Andrew and Jeff Legro. "Is Anybody Still a Realist?" International Security 24:2 (1999), pp. 5–55. (cited 1110 times)
 Moravcsik, Andrew. "Why the European Union Strengthens the State: Domestic Politics and International Cooperation" (Working Paper of the Minda de Gunzberg Center for European Studies, Harvard University, 1999) (cited 833 times plus 157 times in German translation)
 Moravcsik, Andrew. "Introduction: Integrating International and Domestic Theories of International Bargaining," in Peter Evans, Harold Jacobson and Robert Putnam, eds. Double-Edged Diplomacy: International Bargaining and Domestic Politics (Berkeley: University of California Press, 1993), pp. 3–42. (cited 741 times)
 Moravcsik, Andrew. "Is there a 'Democratic Deficit' in World Politics? A Framework for Analysis," Government and Opposition, Volume 39, Issue 2 (Spring 2004), pp. 336–363. (cited 735 times)
 Moravcsik, Andrew. "A New Statecraft? Supranational Entrepreneurs and International Cooperation," International Organization 53:2 (Spring 1999), pp. 267–306. (cited 715 times)
 Keohane, Robert, Andrew Moravcsik and Anne-Marie Slaughter. "Legalized Dispute Resolution: Interstate and Transnational,"  International Organization, Volume 54, Issue 3 (Summer 2000) pp. 457–488. (cited 683 times)
 Moravcsik, Andrew and Milada Vachudova. "National Interests, State Power and European Enlargement," East European Politics and Society (2003). (cited 590 times)
 Keohane, Robert; Macedo, Steven; and Moravcsik, Andrew. "Democracy-enhancing Multilateralism," International Organization, Volume 63, Issue 1, pp. 1–31. (cited 589 times)
 Moravcsik, Andrew. "Liberal Intergovernmentalism and Integration: A Rejoinder," Journal of Common Market Studies, Volume 33, Issue 4, pp. 611–637. (cited 532 times)
 Moravcsik, Andrew and Kalypso Nicolaidis. "Explaining the Treaty of Amsterdam: Interests, Influence, Institutions," Journal of Common Market Studies, Volume 37, Issue 1, pp. 57–85. (cited 529 times)
 Moravcsik, Andrew. "Liberal Intergovernmentalism," in Oxford Research Encyclopedia of Politics (Oxford: Oxford University Press, 2020). (cited 503 times)

See also
 List of political scientists

References

External links

 Faculty Page at Princeton University

1957 births
Living people
American people of Hungarian descent
American political scientists
American political philosophers
Newsweek people
Stanford University alumni
Paul H. Nitze School of Advanced International Studies alumni
Harvard University alumni
Harvard University faculty
Princeton University faculty
American music critics
Bielefeld University alumni
European Union and European integration scholars